Diana Reef is an isolated reef lying  east of D'Urville Monument, Joinville Island, in Active Sound. Roughly surveyed by the Falkland Islands Dependencies Survey in 1954, it was named in 1956 by the UK Antarctic Place-Names Committee after the Diana (Robert Davidson, master), one of the ships of the Dundee whaling expedition which visited the Joinville Island area in 1892–93.

See also
Petrel Cove

References 

Reefs of Graham Land
Landforms of the Joinville Island group